Nando Rafael (born 10 January 1984) is an Angolan professional footballer who plays as a forward for Bali United in the Indonesian Super League.

Early life
Rafael was born in Luanda. He fled from the Angolan Civil War at the age of eight after both of his parents had been killed, and resided at first illegally in the Netherlands. There he did not receive a work permit and was therefore unable to play football professionally, forcing him to move elsewhere.

Club career
In 2002, Rafael signed for Hertha BSC in Germany. In 2006, he was signed by Borussia Mönchengladbach. His first season at AGF was partly spoiled by injuries, making his impact on the team less significant than expected. His physically strong appearance makes him a solid target player, but he also has good technical skills and is a competent goal scorer. He joined from AGF on 10 January 2010 on loan to FC Augsburg for one season. On 19 July 2010, Rafael signed a two-year contract with FC Augsburg.

On 27 June 2013, Rafael joined China League One club Henan Jianye, replacing Joël Tshibamba who was released by the club.

International career
Rafael was born in Angola, raised in the Netherlands, and moved to Germany as a teenager to further his footballing career. Rafael eventually received a German passport and was a German international at U21 level. He switched to the Angola in the 2012 Africa Cup of Nations. He already played for Palancas Negras in a rated-B friendly match against Portuguese side Sporting CP on 10 November 2011.

Career statistics

Honours
Borussia Mönchengladbach
2. Bundesliga: 2007–08

Henan Jianye
China League One: 2013

References

External links
 
 Official Danish league stats 

1984 births
Living people
Angolan footballers
Angola international footballers
German footballers
Germany under-21 international footballers
Naturalized citizens of Germany
AFC Ajax players
Expatriate footballers in the Netherlands
Hertha BSC players
Hertha BSC II players
Borussia Mönchengladbach players
Aarhus Gymnastikforening players
FC Augsburg players
Fortuna Düsseldorf players
Danish Superliga players
German expatriate footballers
Angolan expatriate footballers
Expatriate men's footballers in Denmark
Association football forwards
Bundesliga players
2. Bundesliga players
2012 Africa Cup of Nations players
Angolan emigrants to Germany
Henan Songshan Longmen F.C. players
VfL Bochum players
Expatriate footballers in China
Chinese Super League players
China League One players